Gmina Radłów may refer to either of the following administrative districts in Poland:
Gmina Radłów, Lesser Poland Voivodeship
Gmina Radłów, Opole Voivodeship